Thale may refer to:

 Thale, a city in Germany 
 Thale (Verwaltungsgemeinschaft), a "collective municipality" in the district of Harz, in Saxony-Anhalt, Germany
 Thale (film), 2012 Norwegian film

See also
 Thales (disambiguation)
 Thale cress